Elpida Karamandi was a Macedonian Yugoslav partisian and resistance fighter. 

She born on 1 January 1920, in Florina, Greece, in an Aromanian family. Her mother was divorced from her husband and moved to her relatives in Bitola, then in the Kingdom of Yugoslavia, where she remarried. Karamandi grew up and was educated in Bitola and later continued her studies in Belgrade, where she became a member of SKOJ in 1939. When the Second World War began, Karamandi came back to Bitola. In June 1941, she joined the Yugoslav Communist Party, but her activities were detected by the Bulgarian police and she was arrested. On her release she resumed her resistance work against the occupiers.

In April 1942, she left Bitola and joined the First Bitola Partisan detachment. On 3 May 1942, the detachment was surrounded by the Bulgarian police. Heavily wounded, Elpida Karamandi was captured, and later died in Bulgarian captivity after being tortured. She was declared a Yugoslav national hero on 11 October 1951.

Legacy 
In 1984, Yugoslavia honoured Karamandi with a stamp as part of a series of national heroes of Yugoslavia. A bust of her was erected in Gradski park in Bitola, along with a street that was named after her.

 Elpida Karamandi Primary School in Bitola, North Macedonia (established 1980)

References

External links 

 Elpida Karamandi Primary School (in Macedonian)

1920 births
1942 deaths
People from Florina
Yugoslav Partisans members
Recipients of the Order of the People's Hero
Women in the Yugoslav Partisans
Greek people of Aromanian descent
Yugoslav people of Aromanian descent
Immigrants to Yugoslavia
Resistance members killed by Nazi Germany